Log is the name of several rural localities in Russia:
Log, Novosokolnichesky District, Pskov Oblast, a village in Novosokolnichesky District, Pskov Oblast
Log, Porkhovsky District, Pskov Oblast, a village in Porkhovsky District, Pskov Oblast
Log, Pskovsky District, Pskov Oblast, a village in Pskovsky District, Pskov Oblast
Log, Vladimir Oblast, a village in Vyaznikovsky District of Vladimir Oblast
Log, Volgograd Oblast, a selo in Logovsky Selsoviet of Ilovlinsky District of Volgograd Oblast
Log, Vologda Oblast, a village in Velikoselsky Selsoviet of Kaduysky District of Vologda Oblast
Log, Voronezh Oblast, a selo in Nizhnedevitskoye Rural Settlement of Nizhnedevitsky District of Voronezh Oblast

See also
Log (disambiguation)